Ivan Trabalík (born 8 October 1974) is a Slovak retired football goalkeeper. Trabalík is a well traveled player who has played in his home country of Slovakia, as well as overseas in Poland and Iran and latest in Cyprus.

References

1974 births
Living people
Sportspeople from Nitra
Slovak footballers
Slovak expatriate footballers
Slovakia international footballers
Association football goalkeepers
FK Inter Bratislava players
MŠK Žilina players
MFK Ružomberok players
Wisła Kraków players
Aris Limassol FC players
MFK Dolný Kubín players
Tractor S.C. players
TJ Tatran Oravské Veselé players
Slovak Super Liga players
2. Liga (Slovakia) players
4. Liga (Slovakia) players
Cypriot First Division players
Ekstraklasa players
Expatriate footballers in Cyprus
Expatriate footballers in Poland
Expatriate footballers in Iran
Slovak expatriate sportspeople in Poland
Slovak expatriate sportspeople in Cyprus
Slovak expatriate sportspeople in Iran